Ohio University Chillicothe is a regional campus of Ohio University in Chillicothe, Ohio. Founded in 1946, OHIO Chillicothe campus is the first of Ohio University's regional campuses and the first regional campus in the state. As of 2019, it has an enrollment of approximately 1,500 students.

The campus location and the long-time membership of the Ross County region allows OHIO Chillicothe to draw a unique mix of both traditional college students, young adults ages 18–22 who begin college directly out of high school, and "new traditionals," adults who are pursuing a degree later in life, often after many years in of work experience. In addition, the campus offers a wide variety of course times and schedules, to allow students to take classes when at their own convenience. The campus practices open admissions.

The oldest of the five regional campuses of Ohio University and the first regional campus in the state, OHIO Chillicothe opened as a regional campus in September 1946 to help eliminate post–World War II overcrowding on the university's main campus. The school began with 281 students, 70 percent of which were armed services veterans. Beginning with night courses at Chillicothe High School, OHIO Chillicothe started daytime classes in September 1960 at Chillicothe's First Presbyterian Church. The school moved to its current location on University Hill on the western side of the city in September 1966 with the completion of Bennett Hall.

OHIO Chillicothe offers thirteen associate degrees and eight four-year bachelor's degrees. In addition, a variety of continuing education and tech prep courses are offered by OHIO Chillicothe. There are over thirty full-time faculty members and more than seventy adjunct faculty.

The main campus of Ohio University is located in Athens, Ohio. More than 5,500 students attend Ohio University's five regional campuses. The other campuses include OHIO Eastern (St. Clairsville), OHIO Zanesville, OHIO Lancaster, and OHIO Southern (Ironton).

Academics
OHIO Chillicothe offers 13 associate degree programs and eight bachelor's degree programs.  In addition, OHIO Chillicothe offers numerous other programs in Tech Prep; the first 2 years of the program take place in grades 11–12 in high school. Noncredit courses and workshops are also offered on the Chillicothe campus.

Facilities
OHIO Chillicothe is supported by three main buildings that serve the campus community in a wide range of functions.

Bennett Hall serves as the hub of all campus activity. From classrooms to faculty and administrative offices to the auditorium, students spend a great deal of time in this building in the center of campus. The building also houses a teaching laboratory and mock nursing lab for practical application for students while in the classroom.
Stevenson Center is home to the campus library, Quinn Library. It is also home to the Learning Commons.
Shoemaker Center is the health and wellness facility on campus. It houses a full-sized collegiate basketball court, a running track and multiple weight rooms. It also houses some additional faculty offices and meeting spaces.

Other Facilities
Ross County/Ohio University – Chillicothe Child Development and Family Service Center
Technical Studies Building

Athletics
All Ohio University branch campuses dropped sports, effective the 2021 fall semester.  Ohio University Chillicothe formerly featured intercollegiate athletics in women's volleyball, men's and women's basketball, men's and women's tennis, softball, baseball, and golf as a part of the Ohio Regional Campus Conference.

Alumni
 Donald Ray Pollock, author

References

External links
Official website

Ohio University
Public universities and colleges in Ohio
Buildings and structures in Chillicothe, Ohio
Educational institutions established in 1946
Education in Ross County, Ohio
Satellite campuses
1946 establishments in Ohio